Nat Dye (born c. 1937) is a retired Canadian football player who played for the Edmonton Eskimos and Saskatchewan Roughriders. He played college football at the University of Georgia. He is the brother of Pat Dye.

References

1930s births
Living people
Players of American football from Georgia (U.S. state)
American football defensive ends
Canadian football defensive linemen
American players of Canadian football
Georgia Bulldogs football players
Edmonton Elks players
Saskatchewan Roughriders players